Arecidae is a botanical name at the rank of subclass.  Circumscription of the subclass will vary with the taxonomic system being used (there are many such systems); the only requirement being that it includes the family Arecaceae.

Arecidae in the Takhtajan system
The Takhtajan system used this name for a subclass in the class Liliopsida (=monocotyledons).

 subclass Arecidae
 superorder Arecanae
 order Arecales
 family Arecaceae (or Palmae)
 order Cyclanthales
 family Cyclanthaceae
 order Arales
 family Araceae
 family Lemnaceae
 order Pandanales
 family Pandanaceae
 order Typhales
 family Sparganiaceae
 family Typhaceae

Arecidae in the Cronquist system
The Cronquist system (1981) used this name for a subclass in the class Liliopsida (=monocotyledons), with the circumscription:

 subclass Arecidae
 order Arecales
 family Arecaceae (or Palmae)
 order Cyclanthales
 family Cyclanthaceae
 order Pandanales
 family Pandanaceae
 order Arales
 family Acoraceae
 family Araceae
 family Lemnaceae

APG II system
The APG II system does not use formal botanical names above the rank of order; it assigns the plants included in this subclass by Cronquist in various taxa throughout the clade monocots. In other words, by today's standards Cronquist's subclass was not a "good" group.

References

Monocots